Territet railway station is a railway station in the locality of Territet, within the municipality of Montreux, in the Swiss canton of Vaud. It is an intermediate stop on the standard gauge Simplon line of Swiss Federal Railways. The station is across the street from the valley station of the Territet–Glion funicular railway. Funiculaire Territet–Mont Fleuri was closed in 1992.

Services 
 the following services stop at Territet:

References

External links 
 
 

Railway stations in the canton of Vaud
Swiss Federal Railways stations